Kathleen Bradley is an American former model, former singer, actress and host. She is primarily known as a "Barker's Beauty" on the CBS daytime game show The Price Is Right from 1990 until 2000. She is noted as the first permanent African-American model on the show.

Career
Born to Albert and Winifred Bradley in Girard, Ohio, Bradley was the only girl of four children. She won the "Miss Black California" award in 1971. In the 1970s, she was part of two short-lived disco groups, The Love Machine and Destination. She played the role of Mrs. Parker in the 1995 movie Friday.

Departure from The Price Is Right
Bradley, along with longtime model Janice Pennington, was released from her modeling duties on The Price Is Right in October 2000, shortly after having testified during the lawsuit for slander and defamation of character host and executive producer Bob Barker filed against model Holly Hallstrom. Barker lost his suit against Hallstrom and afterward fired Bradley, Pennington and other show staffers whose testimony contradicted Barker's. She accepted an undisclosed monetary settlement and did not pursue litigation. In June 2014, she released her memoirs, Backstage at The Price Is Right: Memoirs of a Barker Beauty.

Personal
Bradley has been married twice. Her first marriage was to actor Bill Overton from 1980 to 1984. She has been married to mechanical engineer Terrence Redd since 1988. She has two children; a daughter, Cheyenne Overton, from her marriage with Overton; and their son Terrence Redd II. Her stepdaughter Dior is from Redd's marriage to actress Bern Nadette Stanis.

Filmography

Film

Television

References

External links

1951 births
20th-century American actresses
21st-century American actresses
Actresses from Ohio
African-American actresses
African-American female models
American female models
African-American models
20th-century African-American women singers
American dance musicians
American disco musicians
American film actresses
American memoirists
American women memoirists
American women pop singers
American television actresses
Female models from Ohio
Game show models
Living people
Miss Black America delegates
People from Girard, Ohio
Singers from Ohio
African-American beauty pageant winners
21st-century African-American women
21st-century African-American people